Farwell is a surname of English origin. At the time of the British Census of 1881, its relative frequency was highest in Dorset (84.1 times the British average), followed by Buteshire, Hampshire, Somerset, Surrey, Worcestershire, Cheshire, London and Northumberland. Notable people with the surname include:

Arthur Farwell, American composer
Byron Farwell, author and military historian
Charles B. Farwell (1823–1903), American politician
Sir Christopher Farwell (1877–1943), English judge
Sir George Farwell (1845–1915), English judge
George Michell Farwell (1911–1976), English-Australian novelist
Heath Farwell, American football player
Jane Farwell, dancer
John V. Farwell, American politician
Lawrence Farwell, Chief Scientist of Brain Fingerprinting Laboratories, Inc
Leonard J. Farwell (1819–1889), American politician
Nathan A. Farwell (1812–1893), American politician
Oliver Atkins Farwell (1867–1944), American botanist (author abbreviation: Farw.)
Ruth Farwell, British academic and civil servant

See also 

 Barwell (surname)
 Carnell
 Caswell (surname)
 Arkells

Surnames
Surnames of British Isles origin
Surnames of English origin
English-language surnames